Chikhli may refer to places in India:

 Chikhli, Maharashtra, a city and municipal council in Buldhana district, Maharashtra
 Chikhli, Gujarat, a town in Navsari district, Gujarat

See also
 Chikhali (disambiguation)